Stenoptilia lutescens is a moth of the family Pterophoridae. It is found in Spain, France, Switzerland, Italy, Serbia and Montenegro, Albania, and North Macedonia, and on the island of Sardinia.

The length of the forewings is 9–11 mm. Adults are on wing in May.

The larvae feed on Gentiana lutea.

References

External links
lepiforum.de

lutescens
Moths described in 1855
Plume moths of Europe
Taxa named by Gottlieb August Wilhelm Herrich-Schäffer